Capua acrita is a species of moth of the family Tortricidae. It is found in Australia, where it has been recorded from Victoria.

The wingspan is about 13 mm. The forewings are whitish, mixed with reddish-brown and some scattered fuscous scales. The markings are dark-fuscous, with a few reddish-brown scales. The hindwings are pale-grey, faintly strigulated with whitish.

Taxonomy
The species does not belong in the genus Capua and should be placed in a new genus.

References

Moths described in 1916
Archipini